So There is an album by Ben Folds and the yMusic Ensemble, released on September 11, 2015. The album includes eight chamber pop songs and one piano concerto performed with the Nashville Symphony. It is his 5th solo album.

Reception
On Metacritic, which assigns a normalized rating out of 100 to reviews from professional publications, So There received an average score of 66, which indicated "Generally Favorable Reviews". In a review that gave the album an 80/100, AllMusic's Marcy Donelson stated "The album will very likely be embraced by solo Folds aficionados, though it may not appeal to those who strongly favor the brasher Five." In a more negative review, one that gave the album a 58/100, Adam Kivel from Consequence says "In that sense, the orchestra draws out the purest essence of Folds. When he’s cute, he’s so remarkably cute and knows it. When he’s clever, the same holds true. When he’s singing sincerely and digging into deep emotion, the instrumentation doubles down. That makes dramatic songs like “Capable of Anything” and “I’m Not the Man” the most affective, while others are either momentarily fun or obnoxious, depending on your predisposition." Later in the same review saying "Folds' gifts for narrative and composing are clear, but fusing the two more fluidly could be something magical."

Track listing

Personnel
Tracks 1-8:
Ben Folds – piano, vocals, percussion
Rob Moose – violin, harmonies
Nadia Sirota – viola
Gabriel Cabezas – cello
CJ Camerieri – trumpet, French horn
Alex Sopp – flute, alto flute, piccolo, harmonies, cover art
Hideaki Aomori – clarinet, bass clarinet
Gracie Folds – harmony on "So There"

Additional musicians on Phone in a Pool:
Sam Smith – drums
Ryan Lerman – guitar
Chad Chapin – percussion
Andrew Higley – synthesizer and additional arranging

Tracks 9-11:
Ben Folds – Yamaha Concert Grand piano
Nashville Symphony Orchestra – various orchestral instruments

Charts

References

2015 albums
Ben Folds albums
Chamber pop albums
New West Records albums